Nielub  is a village in the administrative district of Gmina Wąbrzeźno, within Wąbrzeźno County, Kuyavian-Pomeranian Voivodeship, in north-central Poland.

During the occupation of Poland (World War II), on October 17, 1939, the Germans carried out a massacre of Poles from Wąbrzeźno in the village (see Nazi crimes against the Polish nation).

References

Nielub